Sparks is an American sitcom that aired on UPN from August 26, 1996, to March 2, 1998. The series stars James Avery, Robin Givens, Terrence Howard, Miguel A. Núñez Jr., Kym Whitley and Arif S. Kinchen. The sitcom is set in Los Angeles, California, and is about the everyday lives of a family of lawyers running a family-owned law practice. Reruns of the show aired on BET in the late 1990s.

Content
The show stars James Avery as Alonzo Sparks, a lawyer running a family law firm with his sons Maxey (Miguel A. Núñez Jr.) and Greg (Terrence Howard) in inner-city Los Angeles, California.

Cast

Main
 James Avery as Alonzo Sparks
 Miguel A. Núñez Jr. as Maxey Sparks
 Terrence Howard as Greg Sparks
 Robin Givens as Wilma Cuthbert
 Kym Whitley as Darice Mayberry
 Arif S. Kinchen as LaMarr Hicks

Recurring
 Wanda-Lee Evans as Judge
 Phill Lewis as Detective Floyd Pitts
 Hawthorne James as Claude
 Rod McCary as Attorney Mason
 Michael Warren as Desmond

Special guest appearances
 Vanessa Bell Calloway as Monique
 Nell Carter as Barbara Rogers
 Terry Ellis as Deidre
 Pam Grier as Ms. Grayson
 Billy Preston as Himself
 Anna Maria Horsford as Wilma's Aunt
 Kenya Moore as Ms. Collins
 Ron O'Neal as Arthur Fairchild
 Jason Kidd as Himself

Episodes

Season 1: 1996–97

Season 2: 1997–98

Reception 
Kevin D. Thompson of The Palm Beach Post gave the show a mostly-negative review, criticizing Avery's performances and the "normal cardboard cutout characters". Frederic M. Biddle of the Boston Globe also criticized the performances of the lead actors and thought that Núñez' and Howard's characters were "silently perpetuating stereotypes equating character with Caucasian features".

References

External links
 

1996 American television series debuts
1998 American television series endings
1990s American black sitcoms
1990s American legal television series
English-language television shows
UPN original programming
Television shows set in California
Television series created by Ed. Weinberger
Television series by MTM Enterprises